Safetica Technologies is a European data loss prevention software (DLP) vendor. Safetica DLP is designed for contextual protection of data at the endpoint level. It blocks erroneous or malicious actions which might lead to sensitive files leaving a company. Safetica can also identify wasted costs connected with low work productivity or ineffective use of software licenses or wasted print.
Safetica Technologies began developing their Data Loss Prevention software (DLP) designed for contextual protection of data at the endpoint level in 2011. Safetica is now being utilised by various organisations in over 110 countries worldwide.

History 
The company's history goes back to 2007 in the Czech Republic. In 2011 the company started using name Safetica Technologies and introduced the first version of product called Safetica DLP. Soon it partnered with investor Ondřej Tomek, put $1,000,00 in research and development and got its first customers abroad. In 2013 Safetica started distribution to the markets in Asia and in the Middle East.

In 2015 Safetica Technologies received $1,500,000 investment for further product development and Petr Žikeš became the new CEO.

In 2016 the company partnered with global antivirus company ESET to bundle its products with their antivirus products, which means that Safetica is distributed throughout their global sales network covering 180 countries.

In November 2019, Safetica announced a partnership with Seclore, provider of the industry's first, open Data-Centric Security Platform, to bring automated detection, protection, and tracking of sensitive information to enterprises.

Products

Safetica DLP 

 Context and content-aware protection for unstructured data (e.g. AutoCAD files) and structured data (e.g. credit card numbers)
 External device management (USB, CD/DVD, FireWire)
 Mobile device management and protection against the danger of loss and theft
 Encryption for computers and external devices
 Productivity management, websites and applications blocking, print control

Safetica Auditor 
 Audit of internal security
 File operations monitoring 
 Employees productivity monitoring

Safetica Mobile
 Company data protection on mobile devices
 Secure device when lost 
 Manage and configure mobile devices

References

Companies based in Prague
Software companies established in 2007
Computer security software companies
Computer security companies
Computer security software
Software companies of the Czech Republic
Czech brands
Czech companies established in 2007